Kevin James McKenna (born 21 January 1980) is a Canadian former professional soccer who played as a centre back and current assistant manager of 1. FC Köln. Occasionally, he also played as a central midfielder or striker.

Club career
McKenna began to play with soccer 1990 in the Academy team of Calgary Foothills and was promoted to the senior team in 1991. He was selected for the Alberta Provincial Under 15 team in 1995 and won the Canadian National Championships with them that year. Owen Hargreaves was also part of that Alberta team.

Energie Cottbus
After playing with Calgary Foothills as an amateur, McKenna played three seasons (the first two in the reserves) with German Bundesliga side Energie Cottbus. In the first game of the 2000–01 season, McKenna and international teammate Paul Stalteri simultaneously became the first Canadian to play in the German Bundesliga in a match between McKenna's newly promoted Cottbus and Stalteri's Werder Bremen.

Hearts

In 2001, McKenna moved to Scottish Premier League team Hearts on loan, playing eight games for the Edinburgh club. After a £300,000 transfer that summer, McKenna was the club's second leading scorer in the 2001–02 season with nine goals in 35 games. As a mostly reserve striker in 2002–03, McKenna scored six in 41. He also scored five goals in 38 games in 2003–04. After falling out of favour at Hearts in 2005, McKenna returned to Energie Cottbus. He was elected as the club's new captain after the departure of former skipper Gregg Berhalter.

1. FC Köln
In the summer of 2007, McKenna signed a four-year contract with 1. FC Köln, dropping down a division to the 2. Bundesliga. McKenna made his debut for his new team on 10 August 2007, in a 2–0 away win against FC St. Pauli. Several weeks later, McKenna scored his first goal for the club on 5 October in a 4–1 home victory over Kickers Offenbach. He helped Köln to promotion into the top flight in his first season with the club.

McKenna scored his first goal in the 2010–11 season in a 4–2 away loss to powerhouse Werder Bremen on 28 August, the other goal scored by teammate Lukas Podolski. Weeks later during the month of September, McKenna had surgery done on his knee and was labeled out indefinitely, however he made a faster recovery then originally anticipated and returned to the first team in early December. He did not see any playing time until being subbed on in the 75th minute to Schalke 04 on 19 December, the game ended as a 3–0 loss.

McKenna made his 2011–12 debut as a starter on 13 August against Schalke in the team's second game of the season, it ended as a 5–1 away loss. Two weeks later Mckenna scored his first goal of the season and the winning goal to beat Hamburger SV in a thrilling 4–3 away victory.

International career
McKenna made his debut for Canada in a May 2000 friendly match against Trinidad and Tobago. By November 2009, he has earned a total of 46 caps, scoring nine goals. He has represented Canada in four FIFA World Cup qualification matches. McKenna has been a regular for the Canadian national team since 2002, when he featured in the CONCACAF Gold Cup as a target man for Holger Osieck's side. McKenna scored three goals, including a brace over Haiti in the first round.

McKenna earned his 50th cap for team Canada in a friendly against Ecuador prior to the 2011 CONCACAF Gold Cup, the game ended in a 2–2 home draw at BMO Field. McKenna was named the captain for Canada during the Gold Cup with Paul Stalteri not in the tournament roster.

Coaching career
After retiring, McKenna started his coaching career as assistant manager for 1. FC Köln's U19 squad. He was then, alongside Markus Daun, assistant coach under head coach Stefan Ruthenbeck on an interim basis 1. FC Köln's Bundesliga team in December 2017, before becoming assistant coach of André Pawlak on the second team of 1. FC Köln in the summer of 2018. After Pawlak was appointed manager for the Bundesliga team in late April 2019, McKenna took over on an interim basis as head coach for the second team in the Regionalliga West. In July 2019, McKenna left the club because he saw no prospect of a position as head coach in the youth area for the foreseeable future.

On 19 September 2019, McKenna was appointed assistant manager of 1. FC Kaiserslautern under the new head coach Boris Schommers. In 2021, he returned to Köln as an assistant coach to Steffen Baumgart.

International goals
Scores and results list Canada's goal tally first, score column indicates score after each McKenna goal.

Honours
International
CONCACAF Gold Cup Third place: 2002

Individual
CONCACAF Gold Cup Best XI: 2002
Canada Soccer Hall of Fame: 2019 Inductee

References

External links
 / Canada Soccer Hall of Fame
 
 

1980 births
Living people
Association football defenders
Canadian soccer players
Soccer players from Calgary
Canadian people of Scottish descent
Canadian expatriate soccer players
Expatriate footballers in Germany
Canadian expatriate sportspeople in Germany
Expatriate footballers in Scotland
Canadian expatriate sportspeople in Scotland
Calgary Foothills FC players
FC Energie Cottbus players
FC Energie Cottbus II players
Heart of Midlothian F.C. players
1. FC Köln players
Bundesliga players
2. Bundesliga players
Scottish Premier League players
Canada men's under-23 international soccer players
Canada men's international soccer players
2001 FIFA Confederations Cup players
2002 CONCACAF Gold Cup players
2003 CONCACAF Gold Cup players
2005 CONCACAF Gold Cup players
2009 CONCACAF Gold Cup players
2011 CONCACAF Gold Cup players
1. FC Köln non-playing staff